A pipeline bridge is a bridge for running a pipeline over a river or another obstacle. Pipeline bridges for liquids and gases are, as a rule, only built when it is not possible to run the pipeline on a conventional bridge or under the river. However, as it is more common to run pipelines for centralized heating systems overhead, for this application even small pipeline bridges are common.

Types
As there is normally a steady flow in pipelines, they can be designed as suspension bridges.

Walkways
A pipeline bridge may be equipped with a walkway for maintenance purposes but, in most cases, this is not open for public access for safety and security reasons.

References

Bridges
Pipeline transport